First Wives Club is a musical with music and lyrics by Brian Holland, Lamont Dozier, and Eddie Holland. The musical is based on the 1996 movie of the same name.

The musical premiered in San Diego, California, in 2009, with a book by Rupert Holmes. A reworked version had a production in Chicago, in 2015, with a new book by Linda Bloodworth-Thomason.

Productions
The first production of the show opened at The Old Globe Theater in San Diego, California, on July 17, 2009, in previews, through August 23, 2009, prior to a projected Broadway engagement. The book was by Rupert Holmes, with a score by the "one-time only reunited" Holland-Dozier-Holland songwriting team from 1960s Motown soul music fame. Francesca Zambello directed the San Diego production. The creators and Zambello were engaged for the project in 2006. An industry reading of the musical was held in February 2009, with principals Ana Gasteyer, Carolee Carmello and Adriane Lenox.

The principal cast in the San Diego production originally included Karen Ziemba as Annie, Adriane Lenox as Elise, Barbara Walsh as Brenda, John Dossett as Aaron, Kevyn Morrow as Bill, Brad Oscar as Morty, Sara Chase as Trophy Wife, and Sam Harris as Duane. Lisa Stevens choreographed, with scenic design by Peter J. Davison and costumes by Paul Tazewell. On June 16, 2009, Lenox dropped out of the production due to health concerns and was replaced by Sheryl Lee Ralph. The production's tryout received mixed to negative reviews, but the production sold approximately 29,000 tickets in its five-week run. 

The musical was reworked and opened in Chicago in March 2015 at the Oriental Theatre with a book re-written by Linda Bloodworth-Thomason of Designing Women. Originating producers, Jonas Neilson and Paul Lambert, teamed with Elizabeth Williams and John Frost, and brought on Simon Phillips to direct.

Musical Numbers

 Act I
 "Stop in the Name of Love" – Elise, Cynthia
 "Reach Out" – Young Cynthia, Brenda, Annie, and Elise
 "Can't Help Myself (Sugar Pie Honey Bunch)" – Young Girl, Bill, Aaron, and Morty
 "Forever Came Today" – Young Husbands and Wives
 "Forever Came Today" (reprise) – Cynthia
 "I'm So Lucky" - Annie, Brenda, Elise
 "I'm Not That Kind of Girl" – Cassandra and the Boys
 "Stir It Up" – Dr. Leslie Rosen
 "My Heart Want to Try One More Time" – Brenda
 "Stir It Up" (reprise) – Club Singers
 "Whirlpool of Emotions" – Annie
 "My World Is Empty Without You" – Cynthia, Brenda, Annie, and Elise
 "Shoulder to Shoulder" – Annie, Elise, and Brenda

 Act II
 "Morty Is the Best" – Morty, Shelley, Ensemble
 "I'm So Lucky" (several reprises) – various
 "I Am Duarto" – Duane
 "One Sweet Moment" – Elise, Brenda, Annie, Aaron, Bill, and Morty
 "Remember Jerusalem" – Jason, Ensemble
 "Payback's a Bitch" – Brenda, Elise, Annie, Duane, Shelley, Ensemble
 "Old Me New Me (Part 1) " – Bill
 "Old Me New Me (Part 2)" – Aaron
 "Old Me New Me (Part 3)" – Morty
 "Finale" – Elise, Annie, Brenda, Ensemble

References

2009 musicals
Musicals based on films